Blake Watson Division 1 College football running back.

Awards and achievements
Memorial Cup Championship (1923)
Allan Cup Championship (1928)
IIHF World Championship (1931)
"Honoured Member" of the Manitoba Hockey Hall of Fame

External links
Blake Watson’s biography at Manitoba Hockey Hall of Fame

Canadian ice hockey left wingers
Ice hockey people from Manitoba
Manitoba Bisons ice hockey players
People from Carman, Manitoba
1903 births
1998 deaths